Robert Smith (Robin) Dods (9 June 1868 – 23 July 1920) was a New Zealand-born Australian architect.

Personal life
Dods was born in Dunedin, New Zealand on 9 June 1868. His parents were Robert Smith Dods (a wholesale grocer) and Elizabeth Gray, née Stodart. His parents both came from Edinburgh, Scotland. However, the family did not stay long in New Zealand and returned to Edinburgh in the early 1870s, where his father died in 1876. His mother Elizabeth then immigrated to Brisbane. On the voyage she met Charles Ferdinard Marks, a physician, whom she married in Brisbane in 1879. Dods was educated at Brisbane Grammar School. He died at Edgecliff, Sydney on 23 July 1920. He was the brother of solicitor Stodart Dods and Queensland Medical Officer Espie Dods. He was the father of eminent physician Lorimer Dods. He had three half-brothers and a half-sister from his mother's second marriage to Dr Charles Marks. They included Alexander Marks and Edward Marks.

Career
Robin Dods worked for the following architectural firms:
 Hay & Henderson (Edinburgh)
 Sir Aston Webb (London)
 Hall & Dods (Brisbane)
 Spain, Cosh & Dods (Sydney)

Dods' period of activity in Brisbane between 1896 and 1916 place him firmly within what is now known as the Federation period. His work however has its origins clearly in the Arts and Crafts movement which swept Britain from the 1870s. Its influence was felt there right up until the beginning of World War I.

Robin Dods was a gifted and capable designer, and was well connected. His surgeon stepfather, Dr Charles Ferdinand Marks, and his uncle, James Stodart, were both members of the Queensland Parliament, in its Upper and Lower houses respectively. Like them, he was admitted into the Protestant power base of the Queensland Club. This was a great asset in building a successful career. Dods was also a founding member of the Brisbane Golf Club and designed its first and second club houses.

Hall & Dods were architects in Queensland for several national enterprises including the AMP Society, the Bank of New South Wales, the New Zealand Insurance Co, JC Hutton & Co, the Australian Mercantile Land and Finance Company, the Engineering Supply Company of Australia as well as several local department stores. For such clients there was the likelihood of repeat commissions, many of which eventuated.

Within the original firm John Hall began in 1864, and the next incarnation, there was an established client base, although many new clients were secured by Dods. Through Dods’ links with the medical profession, Hall & Dods became architects for both of the major hospitals in Brisbane at the time. For the Brisbane General Hospital, where Dods’ stepfather was visiting surgeon and his uncle was chairman of the Hospital Board, Hall & Dods were commissioned for some 10 projects. The Sisters of Mercy also employed Hall & Dods to design a new hospital at South Brisbane — the Mater Misericordiae Hospital. From 1908 the first four buildings were designed and built under the firm's supervision.

An ambitious chapel for the sisters was also designed but not built. Dods designed most of the projects emanating from the partnership. These included a number of modern and distinctive houses in timber for a handful of doctors and other professional clients (often also his friends), several graziers, as well as private residences for his commercial clients. It was through the design of these houses that his reputation largely survives.

Dods visited the Continent in 1891 for a study tour of Italy. It was in Naples that he met Charles Rennie Mackintosh, who was also travelling to fulfil the terms of the Alexander Thomson Scholarship which he had won the previous year. Macintosh was destined to be recognised as one of the pioneers of the Modern Movement, and this meeting could have influenced Dods' architectural outlook.

Robin Dods died on 23 July 1920, and was buried in the South Head Cemetery. At the age of 52, a busy and useful life was thus cut short, and a distinguished architect passed on, to leave in Queensland a legacy of outstanding achievement in the development of its architecture.

Practice in Sydney
Although he had been so busy and successful in Brisbane, Dods felt that his architectural future in this city was limited.

His ambition made him anxious to break into the larger commercial work offering in the south. In 1913 he terminated his partnership with Francis Hall and went to Sydney to join the firm of Spain and Cosh.

Little is now known of Dods' architectural activity in Sydney. He built for himself a house at Edgecliff, described by a contemporary as "charming in its quiet Georgian character, well planned, and forming an attractive setting for the antique furniture he had collected for many years." 
The Newcastle Club, from the offices of Spain and Cosh, is certainly Dods' work, as it exhibits many features characteristic of his Queensland domestic architecture. The largest known work in Sydney that was substantially of Dods' design was the South British Insurance Coy. Ltd. building, at the corner of O'Connell and Hunter Streets.

Domestic work
"A modern house is like matrimony in this, that it is most frequently assailed by those who have failed to attain it for themselves."

Robin Dods achieved early recognition of his domestic work. His houses, when built, were soon noticed and admired. His clients were evidently people with means, since a great bulk of his Brisbane houses were in the wealthy suburbs of Clayfield and New Farm. There is also a Dods house in Charleville and another in Reynella, South Australia. In two known cases only did he design cottage-type houses. These were two groups of three, and evidently designed for clients who were investing in real estate.

Designing to suit the climate was a primary consideration with him. Planning suited the prevailing north-east breeze, and a generous area of wide verandah shaded the living and bedroom areas of his houses. His belief that an insulating layer of air over the house was essential gave rise to the characteristic high-pitched roof ventilated by gablets and neat lanterns.

The Robin Dods Award for Residential Architecture – Houses (New) was established in his honour by the Queensland chapter of the Australian Institute of Architects.

Commercial work
As with his domestic work, Dods' commercial architecture is easily recognised. Again wherever possible he attempted to design for the climate, and his best work shows spacious planning and good ventilation. Soaring real estate values have made much of his planning now seem wasteful, but in any evaluation of his work it must be remembered that he worked in a comparatively small city whose commercial expansion has exceeded even the dreams of the then most visionary businessmen.

Even in Brisbane, commercial buildings have a transitory life, so that of the many buildings designed by the architect a number of them have been demolished, added to, or 
altered out of all recognition. By and large, Dods' commercial work was not inspiring, but several of his buildings were significant, advanced for their time, and well worthy of further study.

Works
His architectural works include:
 4BC House 30-38 Wharf St, Brisbane City, Queensland (destroyed)
 Albury Civic Fire Station, 565 Kiewa Street, Albury, New South Wales
 All Hallows Convent and School, 547 Ann Street, Fortitude Valley, Queensland
 All Saints Memorial Church, Tamrookum Church Road, Tamrookum, Queensland
 Australian Mercantile Land & Finance Woolstores, 34 Vernon Terrace, Teneriffe, Queensland
 Brisbane General Hospital Group 20-30 Bowen Bridge Road, Herston, Queensland
 Brisbane Grammar School (Honour Boards), 24 Gregory Terrace, Spring Hill, Queensland
 Brunoy, 144-146 Beecroft Road, Beecroft, New South Wales
 Church House, 417 Ann Street, Brisbane
 Corbett and Son Store, 446-452 Brunswick Street, Fortitude Valley, Queensland
 Cressbrook Homestead, off Cressbrook-Caboombah Road, Toogoolawah, Queensland
 Eagle Farm Racecourse (St Leger Stand), 230 Lancaster Road, Ascot, Queensland
 Espie Dods House, 97 Wickham Terrace, Spring Hill, Queensland
 Fenton and Garden, 8 Albert Street, Edgecliff, New South Wales
 Fire Station (Former), 932-934 Bourke Street, Zetland, New South Wales
 Franklyn Vale Homestead (summerhouse only), Franklin Vale Road, Grandchester, Queensland
 Glengariff (1907 additions), 5 Derby Street, Hendra, Queensland
 Guildford Fire Station, 263 Guildford Road, Guildford, New South Wales
 Johnson's Building, 64-70 Palmerin Street, Warwick, Queensland
 Killara, 92 Windermere Road, Ascot, Queensland
 Kitawah, 59 Heath St, East Brisbane, Queensland
 Lady Lamington Nurses Home, 282 Herston Road, Herston, Queensland
 Lyndhurst, 3 London Road, Clayfield, Queensland
 Manumbah, 64 Massey Street, Ascot, Queensland
 Mardoc Building, Federal Street, Narrogin, Western Australia
 Mark Foys Warehouse (Former), 133 Goulburn Street, Surry Hills, New South Wales
 Maryborough City Hall, 388 Kent Street, Maryborough, Queensland
 Mater Misericordiae Private and Former Public Hospitals, Raymond Terrace, South Brisbane, Queensland
 Mount Carmel Convent, 199 Bay Terrace, Wynnum, Queensland
 Mudgee Post Office, 80 Market Street, Mudgee, New South Wales
 Myendetta Homestead Myendetta Station, Bakers Bend, Shire of Murweh, Queensland
 Ringsfield House, Nanango, Queensland
 Nindooinbah Homestead (1906 extensions), Nindooinbah House Road, Beaudesert, Queensland
 Old Bishopsbourne, 233 Milton Road, Milton, Queensland
 Old Bishopsbourne Chapel, 233 Milton Road, Milton, Queensland
 Ralahyne (1904 alterations), 40 Enderley Road, Clayfield, Queensland
 Rangemoor Circa 1910, 165 Adelaide Street East Clayfield, Queensland
 Narallan, Abbott Street, 41 Abbott Street, New Farm, Queensland
 Ruddle's Building, 327 Brunswick Street Mall, Fortitude Valley, Queensland
 Shafston House, 23 Castlebar St, Kangaroo Point, Queensland
 St Andrew's Anglican Church, Mangerton St, Toogoolawah, Queensland
 St Brigid's Church, 78 Musgrave Road, Red Hill, Queensland
 St Mark's Anglican Church, Junner Street, Dunwich, Queensland
 St John's Cathedral, 401–413 Ann Street, Brisbane
 TC Beirne Department Store, 28 Duncan Street, Fortitude Valley, Queensland
 The Deanery (1909-10 verandahs), 417 Ann Street, Brisbane
 The Newcastle Club, 40 Newcomen Street, Newcastle, New South Wales
 Theosophical Society Building, 355 Wickham Terrace, Spring Hill, Queensland
 Turrawan, 8 London Road, Clayfield, Queensland
 Wairuna, 27 Hampstead Road, Highgate Hill, Queensland
 Wattlebrae Hospital Group (former), 30 Bowen Bridge Road, Herston, Queensland
 Webber House, 417-19 Ann Street, Brisbane
 Willoughby Fire Station 53 Laurel Street, Willoughby, New South Wales
He designed the school badge for Somerville House, a Brisbane private school in 1902.

Styles
He built in the following architectural styles:
 Federation Gothic, Arts and Crafts and Bungalow
 Inter-War Georgian Revival

Gallery

References

Further reading
 Dods, Robin Smith (Robin), Australian Dictionary of Biography
 Domain Photography: The legacy of Robin Dods
 Robert Riddel, Art in Architecture: the work of Robin Dods, Brisbane, URO Media, 2012
 Robin Dods: An introduction, August 8, 2012, Australian Design Review 
 R. Boyd, Australia's Home (Melbourne, 1952)
 P. Cox and H. Tanner (eds), Twelve Australian Architects (Sydney, 1979)
 JRHSQ, 8 (1968–69), no 4, p 649
 J. S. Egan, The Work of Robin Dods, A.R.I.B.A (B. Arch thesis, University of Sydney, 1932)
 R. J. Riddel, R. S. Dods in Sydney, 1913–20 (conference paper, Art Assn of Australia, 1979)
 R. S. Lorimer, letters to R. S. Dods, 1896–1920 (University of Edinburgh)
 R. S. Dods diary, 1909 (privately held)
 Harriet Edquist, Pioneers of Modernism, The Arts and Crafts Movement in Australia, Melbourne, Miegunyah Press, 2008
 Elizabeth Farrelly They went their own way, to a late acclaim
 J. Hall & Son, tender book, vol 2 (1859-1912) (copy in State Library of Queensland)
 Correspondence, Hall & Dods and Spain, Cosh & Dods (Bank of New South Wales Archives, Sydney).
 Federation-Home Archive| Architect Robin Dods

External links
 
 Hall & Dods: Designing Queensland album of architectural plans on Flickr, by State Library of Queensland.
 Hall & Dods architectural drawings: conservation and digitisation, at State Library of Queensland.

1868 births
1920 deaths
Architects from Brisbane
Federation architects
Architects from Dunedin
Scottish emigrants to Australia
19th-century Australian architects
20th-century Australian architects